Jules Salvador Moch (15 March 1893, in Paris – 1 August 1985, in Cabris, Alpes-Maritimes) was a French politician.

Biography
Moch was born into a renowned French Jewish military family, the son of Captain Gaston Moch and Rébecca Alice Pontremoli. His grandfather was Colonel Jules Moch. His upbringing occurred during a growing socialist movement in France. He was in Polytechnique along with Alfred Dreyfus. As an engineer (polytechnicien) who took part in the X-Crise Group, he was a socialist member of Parliament for Drôme and then Hérault from 1928 to 1936 and from 1937 to 1940. He was Under-secretary of State in prime minister Léon Blum's office (1937) and became Minister of Public Works in 1938.

During World War II Moch was critical of the Vichy French government and was jailed but later was released. He joined and helped organise the Paris underground. He also helped other French Resistance activities in France. When the Free French Naval Forces was organized, he rallied to de Gaulle in 1942 and participated in The Invasion of Normandy toward the Free French Liberation of France with the Allies.

After World War II, Moch was a member of the Consultative Assembly (1944) and of the two Constituent National Assemblies (1945–1946) and then of the National Assembly (1946–1958 and 1962–1967). He was eight times minister during the Fourth Republic: Public works and Transportation (1945–1947), Interior (1947–1950), Defence (1950–1951). As Transport Minister, he contributed to the rebuilding of railways, ports, road, navy and aviation. As Interior Minister, he had to deal with the communist-inspired great strikes in November 1947 and showed great firmness. In the Defence Ministry, he contributed to the modernisation of the army, organised French participation in the Korean War and the implementation of NATO. He also suggested and participated in the forming of the Baghdad Pact for the Middle East. He fought the Gaullist and Communist Parties during the Fourth Republic and was one of the leaders of the Troisième Force. 
 
He was deputy prime minister from 1949 to 1950. He was France's delegate at the UN disarmament commission from 1951 to 1960. As rapporteur of the Foreign Affairs Committee, he opposed the European Community of Defence, which was defeated by the National Assembly in 1954. His last ministerial post was in Pierre Pflimlin's government in May 1958 where he played an important role in the May 1958 crisis of French Algeria, as Interior Minister. He left the Socialist Party in 1975.

He was married to Germaine Picard, one of the first woman lawyers of France. She was also an active advocate of the women's rights movement in France and Europe.

Though other noted individuals lay claim, it is alleged that the name Cold War was officially "coined" after a speech he made in 1948 over his concern on the growing rift that developed between the Allies of Western Europe and the Warsaw Pact Forces of Eastern Europe.

Publications 
He has published: 
Confrontations (Doctrines – Déviations – Expériences – Espérances), Gallimard 1952
Yougoslavie, terre d'expérience, éd. du Rocher, Monaco, 1953
Histoire du réarmement allemand depuis 1950, Robert Laffont, 1954
Alerte, le problème crucial de la Communauté Européenne de défense, Robert Laffont
La folie des hommes (about the atomic bomb), Robert Laffont, 1954
En 1961, Paix en Algérie, Robert Laffont
Non à la force de frappe, Robert Laffont, 1963
Le Front Populaire, Perrin 1971
Rencontre avec Charles de Gaulle, 1971
Une si longue vie, témoignages, Robert Laffont, 1976
Le communisme jamais, Plon 1978

Biography 
Eric Méchoulan has written a book: Jules Moch un socialiste dérangeant, published by Bruylant.
Autobiography of Jules Moch: "Jules Moch" une si longue vie, published by Robert Laffont 1976, Paris

See also
List of Interior Ministers of France

References

External links
 

1893 births
1985 deaths
Politicians from Paris
Jewish French politicians
French Section of the Workers' International politicians
French interior ministers
French Ministers of Defence
French Ministers of Public Works
Transport ministers of France
Members of the 14th Chamber of Deputies of the French Third Republic
Members of the 15th Chamber of Deputies of the French Third Republic
Members of the 16th Chamber of Deputies of the French Third Republic
Members of the Constituent Assembly of France (1945)
Members of the Constituent Assembly of France (1946)
Deputies of the 1st National Assembly of the French Fourth Republic
Deputies of the 2nd National Assembly of the French Fourth Republic
Deputies of the 3rd National Assembly of the French Fourth Republic
Deputies of the 2nd National Assembly of the French Fifth Republic
The Vichy 80
École Polytechnique alumni
French Resistance members
Jews in the French resistance
French military personnel of World War II